Ablabesmyia miki is a species of fly described by Adrian R.Plant in 1989.  No sub-species specified in Catalogue of Life.

References

Hybotidae